Events in the year 1806 in India.

Incumbents
 Shah Alam II, Mughal Emperor, reigned 10 December 1759 – 19 November 1806
 Akbar II, Mughal Emperor, reigned 19 November 1806 – 28 September 1837
 General Gerard Lake, 1st Viscount Lake,  Commander-in-Chief of India, March 1801 – July 1805

Events 
National income - ₹11,730 million
 19 November – Akbar II Akbar Shah, Mughal Emperor ascended to the throne of Delhi.

Law

Births

Deaths
 19 November – Shah Alam II, Mughal Emperor

 
Years of the 19th century in India